The White River (French: rivière White) is a tributary of Lake Superior in Thunder Bay District, Ontario, Canada. It starts at Negwazu Lake and flows in a predominantly western direction to Lake Superior, passing through the Township of White River.

The White River has many stretches of whitewater and four waterfalls with some difficult portages, making the river suitable for advanced canoeists. The lower part of the river has occasional oxbows and meanders. Among its tributaries are the Bremner, Depew, and Oskabukuta Rivers. The river contains a diversity of fish species, including healthy walleye populations.

Provincial parks
Several sections of the river are protected in parks and reserves.

Directly south of the White Lake outlet, the river flows briefly through the White Lake Forest Reserve. The White River in this section flows through 16 landform vegetation combinations, and drops  or about four metres per kilometre.

The remaining  of the river is protected in the Pukaskwa National Park.

Hydroelectricity
The White River system has 3 hydroelectric generating stations (all located within the White Lake Provincial Park):

Completed in 2016 and owned by a joint venture of the Pic Mobert First Nation and Regional Power, the facilities replace an old dam that regulated lake levels and flood flows on White Lake.

It was commissioned in 2008 and co-owned by the Pic River First Nation and Innergex Group.

See also
List of rivers of Ontario
Pukaskwa River - nearby river with similar characteristics

References

Rivers of Thunder Bay District
Tributaries of Lake Superior
Rivers of Algoma District